Canlan Sports – York is an ice hockey arena in Toronto, Ontario, Canada, and is operated by Canlan Ice Sports Corporation. It is the main ice rink at York University's Keele Campus, as the home of the York Lions men's and women's varsity hockey teams. It is also the home of the Toronto Six of the Premier Hockey Federation. The facility opened in 1996 as the Beatrice Ice Gardens, and has one Olympic-sized and five NHL-sized ice rinks. The seating capacity for the largest rink is 1,200. The arena has also been used for National Hockey League training camps.

The current complex replaced the York University Ice Palace, built in 1968. The building lacked seating for spectators, and has since been converted into the Sherman Health Science Research Centre. The arena was purchased by Canlan Ice Sports in August 2007. On 1 October 2020, the Toronto Six announced they had an agreement in place to play their inaugural season in the Premier Hockey Federation, known at the time as the National Women's Hockey League, at the facility, as well as having locker rooms built out specifically for the team.

References

External links
Official web site

Ice hockey venues in Toronto
Indoor arenas in Ontario
Indoor ice hockey venues in Ontario
York University buildings
Toronto Six
1996 establishments in Ontario
Sports venues completed in 1996